THE ELEV3N is an American production, songwriting and multi-instrumentalist team currently based in New York City, consisting of members James G. Morales, Matt Morales, and Dave Rodriguez. Since forming in 2011, the trio has achieved success in production and songwriting for pop, hip hop and R&B acts such as Meghan Trainor, Karmin, Sean Kingston, Cher Lloyd, Jesse McCartney, Bea Miller and the Wanted.

Career
With all three members born and raised into the New York City music scene they each gained experience as multi instrumentalists Dave (guitar, bass, keyboards) Matt (trumpet, keyboards) James (drums keyboards, alto saxophone) at church and for various local bands. After graduating from Glen Cove High school where brothers James and Matt took up music playing for the school band they attended Berklee College of Music on scholarship to study Music Production & Engineering and Music Business. Dave attended Seton Hall and pursued a career as a live musician supporting various artists domestically and overseas and as a guitarist for Estelle.

While at Berklee James caught the attention of producer Rodney “Darkchild” Jerkins and went on to work at his studio compound in Atlantic City, NJ after graduating in 2006. A few years later Matt returned to New York after graduating from Berklee in 2009 to engineer sessions for various record labels and artists such as Melanie Fiona, Tinashe, Jack Antonoff from the band FUN. In 2011 the trio collectively decided to join forces to work on songwriting and music production as THE ELEV3N.

After reconnecting with former Berklee classmate and friend  Nils Gums of The Complex Group in 2012 the team entered into a management agreement with the Complex Group and landed a production deal with Antonio L.A. Reid CEO of Epic Records in addition to a publishing agreement with the world's leading music publisher, Sony/ATV.

THE ELEV3N have had several media and publication features by Billboard Magazine, MTV, CNN, CBS, and work actively between their studio in Manhattan NY, and Los Angeles, CA.

Partial discography 
Sean Kingston feat. Cher Lloyd  "Rum & Raybans" – Single: Writer, producer, musician
Karmin Pulses (Epic Records / Sony Music Entertainment)
"Hate 2 Love You": Writer, producer, musician
"Geronimo": Writer, producer, musician
"What's in It For Me": Writer, producer, musician
Los 5 "Mexico" – Single: Writer, producer, musician
Meghan Trainor Title
"Bang Dem Sticks": Writer, producer, musician
Bea Miller "Not an Apology"
"Paper Doll": Writer, producer, musician
Jesse McCartney In Technicolor LP 2014: Album producers
"In Technicolor": Writer, producer, musician
"Back Together" – Single: Writer, producer, musician
"Young Love": Writer, producer, musician
"Superbad" – Single: Writer, producer, musician
"All About Us": Writer, producer, musician
"Goodie Bag": Writer, producer, musician
"In Technicolor, Pt. II": Writer, producer, musician
"Tie the Knot": Writer, producer, musician
"The Other Guy": Writer, producer, musician
Meghan Trainor – Thank You
"Kindly Calm Me Down": Writer, producer, musician
"Woman Up": Writer, producer, musician
Ashley Roberts Butterfly Effect
 "Woman Up" – Single: Writer, producer, musician
Steve Grand All American Boy
"Soakin' Wet": Writer, producer, musician
Fifth Harmony – TBD (Release: 2016)
"TBD": Writer, producer, musician
Twice – What Is Love?
"Ho!": Producer, musician

References

External links
Official website

Living people
Musicians from New York (state)
Record producers from New York (state)
American pop musicians
Songwriters from New York (state)
Record production trios
American songwriting teams
Year of birth missing (living people)